Dudino is a rural locality (a village) in Yudinskoye Rural Settlement, Velikoustyugsky District, Vologda Oblast, Russia. The population was 10 as of 2002.

Geography 
Dudino is located 5 km northeast of Veliky Ustyug (the district's administrative centre) by road. Konshevo is the nearest rural locality.

References 

Rural localities in Velikoustyugsky District